Labordia kaalae, the Waianae Range labordia, is a species of flowering plant in the Loganiaceae family.

It is endemic to the Waianae Mountains on Oahu island in Hawaii.

It is an endangered species, threatened by habitat loss.

References

kaalae
Endemic flora of Hawaii
Biota of Oahu
Waianae Range
Taxonomy articles created by Polbot